= Humphrey Bromley =

Unitarian preacher (fl. 1796–1826)

Humphrey Bromley (fl. 1796–1826) was a Welsh Unitarian preacher. He may have been the first Unitarian preacher in North Wales. His parents were Humphrey and Jane Bromley, of Tre-brys, Llanrhaeadr-ym-Mochnant, Denbighshire. He (like his father) worked as a gardener, but he also ran a school in the Pont Maes Mochnant area.

Although he was originally an Anglican, he became a Unitarian preacher, being supported financially by a Mr Lloyd, a local shopkeeper. He preached at some of the meetings of the South Wales Unitarian Association which were held annually.

He later immigrated to the US. His date of death is unknown.
